The God Within is a 1912 American short drama film directed by  D. W. Griffith and starring Blanche Sweet. A print of the film survives.

Cast
 Henry B. Walthall as The Woodsman
 Claire McDowell as The Woodsman's Wife
 Blanche Sweet as The Woman of the Camp
 Lionel Barrymore as The Woman of the Camp's Lover
 Charles Hill Mailes as The Doctor
 Gertrude Bambrick as In Bar
 Clara T. Bracy as The Madam
 William J. Butler as In Other Town
 W. Christy Cabanne as On Street
 Harry Carey
 John T. Dillon as On Street
 Frank Evans as In Bar
 Charles Gorman as In Bar/In Other Town
 Joseph Graybill as In Bar
 J. Jiquel Lanoe as In Other Town
 Adolph Lestina as In Other Town
 W. C. Robinson as In Bar
 Charles West as In Other Town (as Charles H. West)

See also
 Harry Carey filmography
 D. W. Griffith filmography
 Blanche Sweet filmography
 Lionel Barrymore filmography

References

External links

1912 films
1912 short films
1912 drama films
Silent American drama films
American silent short films
Biograph Company films
American black-and-white films
Films directed by D. W. Griffith
1910s American films